Gyrolithes is a trace fossil consisting of a vertically spiraling burrow, known from Cambrian strata onward.

References

Burrow fossils